Nojim Maiyegun (born 17 February 1941 in Lagos) is a retired Nigerian boxer, who won the bronze medal in the men's Light Middleweight (71 kg) category at the 1964 Summer Olympics in Tokyo, Japan.

He was Nigeria's first Olympic medalist. He revealed his loss of vision in 2012.

Sources

External links
 
Article - The Death of Nigerian Sports And A Walk Down Memory Lane

1941 births
Living people
Light-middleweight boxers
Olympic boxers of Nigeria
Boxers at the 1964 Summer Olympics
Olympic bronze medalists for Nigeria
Boxers at the 1966 British Empire and Commonwealth Games
Commonwealth Games bronze medallists for Nigeria
Sportspeople from Lagos
Olympic medalists in boxing
Nigerian male boxers
Nigerian blind people
Medalists at the 1964 Summer Olympics
Commonwealth Games medallists in boxing
Medallists at the 1966 British Empire and Commonwealth Games